Henry Joel Cadbury (December 1, 1883 – October 7, 1974) was an American biblical scholar, Quaker historian, writer, and non-profit administrator.

Life
A graduate of Haverford College, Cadbury was a Quaker throughout his life, as well as an agnostic. Forced out of his teaching position at Haverford for writing an anti-war letter to the Philadelphia Public Ledger, in 1918, he saw  the experience as a milestone, leading him to larger service beyond his Orthodox Religious Society of Friends. He was offered a position in the Divinity School at Harvard University, from which he had received his Ph.D., but he first rejected its teacher's oath for reasons of conscience, the Quaker insistence on telling the truth, and as a form of social activism. He later accepted the Hollis Professorship of Divinity (1934–1954). He also was the director of the Harvard Divinity School Library (1938–1954), and chairman (1928–1934; 1944–1960) of the American Friends Service Committee, which he had helped found in 1917. He was elected to the American Academy of Arts and Sciences. He delivered the Nobel lecture on behalf of the AFSC when it, together with the British Friends Service Council, accepted the Nobel Peace Prize in 1947 on behalf of the Religious Society of Friends. He was elected to the American Philosophical Society in 1949. He was also awarded an honorary Doctor of Laws (LL. D.) degree from Whittier College in 1951.

Controversial remarks
In 1934, Cadbury encouraged Jews to engage Nazis with good will, according to The New York Times, which characterized his stance as, "Good will, not hate or reprisals, will end, or offset, the evils of Hitler government's persecution of Jews." The suggestion was repudiated by the rabbis he made it to, led by Stephen S. Wise.

Select works

Thesis

Books

Edited by

Journal articles

References

Further reading
Bacon, Margaret H., Let This Life Speak: The Legacy of Henry Joel Cadbury. U of Pennsylvania P, 1987. .
Padilla, Osvaldo. "The Wirkungsgeschichte of Henry Joel Cadbury as an Objective Historian: An Exploration of America’s Premiere Luke–Acts Scholar." Bulletin for Biblical Research 29, no. 4 (2019): 499–510.

External links
 Philadelphia Inquirer obituary
  Biography was prepared by Sarah DeSantis, Spring 2009
 Nobel Peace Prize lecture
 Award Ceremony Speech re "The Nobel Peace Prize, 1947, to the Friends Service Council, American Friends Service Committee"
 Henry Joel Cadbury Papers from Swarthmore College Peace Collection

1883 births
1974 deaths
Writers from Philadelphia
American pacifists
American agnostics
American Quakers
Quaker writers
Nontheist Quakers
American biblical scholars
New Testament scholars
American historians of religion
Haverford College alumni
Harvard Divinity School alumni
Haverford College faculty
Bryn Mawr College faculty
Harvard Divinity School faculty
William Penn Charter School alumni
Historians from Pennsylvania
Members of the American Philosophical Society